No. 22 Squadron ( or ) was a fighter squadron of the Finnish Air Force during World War II. The squadron was part of Flying Regiment 2. It was to be equipped with new Brewster Buffaloes and Hawker Hurricane Is, but only the first Flight saw action during the war. After the Winter War, the squadron was attached to the new Flying Regiment 3 and renamed as No. 32 Squadron.

Organization

Winter War
1st Flight (1. Lentue)
2nd Flight (2. Lentue)
3rd Flight (3. Lentue)
Detachment Räty (Os. Räty/LLv.22) formed to collect the Hurricanes and to train pilots on the aircraft. Aircraft arrived too late to participate in the war.

The equipment consisted of 5 Brewster Buffaloes, and 10 Hawker Hurricane Is.

Bibliography

External links
Lentolaivue 22

22